Patriarch Theodosius I may refer to:

Patriarch Theodosius I of Alexandria, ruled in 535–536
Theodosius I of Constantinople, Ecumenical Patriarch in 1179–1183